Pickering—Ajax—Uxbridge was an electoral district in Ontario, Canada, that was represented in the House of Commons of Canada from 1997 to 2003. This riding was created in 1996, from parts of Durham and Ontario ridings.

It consisted of the Township of Uxbridge, the Town of Pickering, and the part of the Town of Ajax lying north of Kingston Road.

The electoral district was abolished in 2003 when it was redistributed between Ajax—Pickering, Clarington—Scugog—Uxbridge and Pickering—Scarborough East ridings.

Members of Parliament

This riding has elected the following Members of Parliament:

Election results

|- 
  
|Liberal
|Dan McTeague
|align="right"| 26,003   
  
|Progressive Conservative
|Leanne Lewis 
|align="right"| 10,802    

 
|New Democratic
|Douglas W. Grey 
|align="right"|2,576    
|}

|-
  
|Liberal
|Dan McTeague
|align="right"| 28,834   

  
|Progressive Conservative
|Michael Hills 
|align="right"|6,883    
 
|New Democratic
|Ralph Chatoor 
|align="right"|1,523    

|}

See also 

 List of Canadian federal electoral districts
 Past Canadian electoral districts

References

External links 

 Website of the Parliament of Canada
 Elections Ontario  1999 results and 2003 results

Former federal electoral districts of Ontario